Francois Harley (born 10 October 1999) is a South African cricketer. He made his first-class debut on 5 March 2020, for South Western Districts in the 2019–20 CSA 3-Day Provincial Cup.

References

External links
 

1999 births
Living people
South African cricketers
South Western Districts cricketers
Place of birth missing (living people)